Massachusetts's 2nd congressional district is located in central Massachusetts (Central Massachusetts is the geographically central region of Massachusetts). It contains the cities of Worcester, which is the second-largest city in New England after Boston, and Northampton in the Pioneer Valley. It is represented by Democrat Jim McGovern.

The shape of the district was changed for the elections of 2012, after Massachusetts congressional redistricting to reflect the 2010 census. The new district covers central Massachusetts, including much of Worcester County, and is largely the successor to the old 3rd District.  Most of the old 2nd district, including Springfield, has been moved into the new 1st district.

Recent election results from presidential races

Locations

1795 to 1803 
Known as the 2nd Western District.

1803 to 1813 
Known as the "Essex North" district.

1813 to 1833 
Known as the "Essex South" district.

1843 to 1853 

The Act of September 16, 1842 established the district on the North Shore and New Hampshire border, with the following municipalities:
 In Essex County: Beverly, Danvers, Essex, Gloucester, Hamilton, Ipswich, Lynn, Lynnfield, Manchester, Marblehead, Middleton, Rockport, Salem, Saugus, Topsfield, and Wenham
 In Middlesex County: Malden, Medford, Reading, South Reading, and Stoneham
 In Suffolk County: Chelsea

1860s 
"Parts of the counties of Bristol, Norfolk, and Plymouth."

1870s–1900s

1903 to 1913 

During this decade, the district contained the following municipalities:
In Franklin County: Erving, Leverett, Montague, New Salem, Northfield, Orange, Shutesbury, Sunderland, Warwick, and Wendell.
In Hampshire County: Amherst, Belchertown, Easthampton, Enfield, Granby, Hadley, Northampton, Pelham, Prescott, South Hadley, and Ware.
In Hampden County: Brimfield, Chicopee, East Longmeadow, Hampden, Holland, Longmeadow, Ludlow, Monson, Palmer, Springfield, Wales, and Wilbraham.
In Worcester County: Athol, Barre, Brookfield, Dana, Hardwick, New Braintree, North Brookfield, Oakham, Petersham, Phillipston, Royalston, Warren, and West Brookfield.

1913 to 1923 
During this decade, the district contained the following municipalities:
In Franklin County: Bernardston, Deerfield, Erving, Gill, Leverett, Montague, Northfield, Shutesbury, Sunderland, Warwick, Wendell, and Whately.
In Hampshire County: Amherst, Belchertown, Easthampton, Enfield, Granby, Hadley, Hatfield, Northampton, Pelham, South Hadley, Ware, and Williamsburg.
In Hampden County: Agawam, Chicopee, East Longmeadow, Hampden, Longmeadow, Ludlow, Springfield, West Springfield, and Wilbraham.

1920s–2002

2003 to 2013 

During this decade, the district contained the following municipalities:

 In Hampden County: Agawam, Brimfield, Chicopee, East Longmeadow, Hampden, Holland, Longmeadow, Ludlow, Monson, Palmer, Springfield, Wales, Wilbraham.
 In Hampshire County: Hadley, Northampton, South Hadley.
 In Norfolk County: Bellingham.
 In Worcester County: Blackstone, Brookfield, Charlton, Douglas, Dudley, East Brookfield, Grafton, Hopedale, Leicester, Mendon, Milford, Millbury, Millville, North Brookfield, Northbridge, Oxford, Southbridge, Spencer, Sturbridge, Sutton, Upton, Uxbridge, Warren, Webster.

Since 2013 

 In Franklin County: Deerfield, Erving, Gill, Greenfield, Leverett, Montague, New Salem, Northfield, Orange, Shutesbury, Sunderland, Warwick, Wendell, and Whately.
 In Hampden County: Precinct 1A in Palmer
 In Hampshire County: Amherst, Belchertown, Hadley, Hatfield, Northampton, Pelham, and Ware.
 In Norfolk County: Precincts 4A and 5 in Bellingham
 In Worcester County: Athol, Auburn, Barre, Blackstone, Boylston, Douglas, Grafton, Hardwick, Holden, Hubbardston, Leicester, Leominster, Mendon, Millbury, Millville, New Braintree, North Brookfield, Northborough, Northbridge, Oakham, Oxford, Paxton, Petersham, Phillipston, Princeton, Royalston, Rutland, Shrewsbury, Spencer, Sterling, Sutton, Templeton, Upton, Uxbridge, Webster, West Boylston, West Brookfield, Westborough, Worcester, and Precinct 1 in Winchendon.

List of members representing the district

Recent election results

1988

1990

1992

1994

1996

1998

2000

2002

2004

2006

2008

2010

2012

2014

2016

2018

2020

References

 Congressional Biographical Directory of the United States 1774–present

External links

 CNN.com 2004 election results
 CNN.com 2006 election results
Map of Massachusetts's 2nd Congressional District, 2003–2013, via Massachusetts Secretary of the Commonwealth
 
 

02
Springfield, Massachusetts
Government of Hampden County, Massachusetts
Government of Hampshire County, Massachusetts
Government of Norfolk County, Massachusetts
Government in Worcester County, Massachusetts
Princeton, Massachusetts
1789 establishments in Massachusetts
Constituencies established in 1789